Tyrel may refer to:

People
Tyrel Dodson (born 1998), American football player
Tyrel Griffith (born 1985), Canadian curler
Tyrel Jackson Williams (born 1997), American actor
Tyrel Lomax (born 1996), Australian professional rugby union player
Tyrel Lacey (born 1986), American soccer goalkeeper
Tyrel Reed (born 1989), American basketball player
John Tyrel (1840-1885), Australian politician

Other
Tyrel (film), a 2018 film

See also
Tyrrell (disambiguation)